Santo Domingo de los Colorados, often simply referred to as Santo Domingo (Quechua: Tsachila), is an Ecuadorian city and seat of the canton that bears its name and the Santo Domingo de los Tsáchilas Province. It is the fourth most populous city in Ecuador, with a population of over 460,000, and is an important commercial and industrial center.

Etymology
The name, "de los Colorados", refers to a local ethnic group, the Tsáchila, and the custom of men in that tribe to dye their hair with extract of the achiote plant; hence "Santo Dominigo de los Colorados" or "Santo Domingo of the Dyed." This group, which is indigenous to the area, is recognised with a substantial statue near the town center.

Geography
Santo Domingo is located approximately 133 km west of Quito at an elevation of 625 m. Santo Domingo lies in the foothills west of the Andes. It is important stopping point on the road from Quito to the Pacific coast. The city also connects other lowland cities like Quevedo, Chone, and Quinindé.

The city is also the seat of the Roman Catholic Diocese of Santo Domingo de los Colorados.

Climate
Santo Domingo has a tropical monsoon climate under Köppen climate classification (Am) with influences of elevation. Average temperatures hover around 71 degrees Fahrenheit. Like many other cities on this side of the Andes it floods easily. Roads between Quito and coastal cities such as Esmeraldas and Manta are often washed out and require frequent work.

References

External links

Provincial capitals in Ecuador
Populated places in Santo Domingo de los Tsáchilas Province
1861 establishments in Ecuador
Populated places established in 1861